Voi is the largest town in Taita-Taveta County in southern Kenya, in the former Coast Province. It lies at the western edge of the Taru Desert, south and west of the Tsavo East National Park.  The Sagala Hills are to the south.

Economy

Voi is a marketplace for agricultural and meat products from the fertile Taita Hills as well as the  surrounding areas. Voi's town centre consists mostly of general stores, shops, markets, kiosks and hotels. Most lodges that service tourists for the national parks are located in the suburbs at the edge of town. The Voi Sisal Estates are located to the west of the town.

Hotels in the area include Andymac Palace, Panlis Resort, Augustine George Resort, Impala Hotel, Vacani Resort, Ndololo Camp, Voi Safari Lodge, Voi Wildlife Lodge, Joy Hotel, Afrika Lodges, and Leopards Lodge. Nearby restaurants include Asenali, Homeboys, Bakri, Distarr Hotel, Swahili Dishes, Fine breeze, Petro and Caltex. Supermarkets such as Bafagih being a first class supermarket Jai Hari, Shake Distributors, New Generation, and Anand can also be found in Voi.

History
Voi existed even before the arrival of the Portuguese, Arabs and other visitors at the Kenyan Coast [disputed ... see talk section. Also, the "Kenya Coast" did not conceptually exist prior to 1920 and at the time of Voi's origin much of the "Kenya Coast" (BEA Protectorate) was on 'loan' from Zanzibar]. However, some citations have it that the town started to grow at the end of the 19th century when the Uganda Railway was constructed. People started to move in to work on the railway and the nearby sisal estates. The town has long since outgrown the original grant.

Climate 
Voi has a hot semi-arid climate (Köppen climate classification BSh).

Transport

Train
Voi has two railway stations. The first and oldest station, lies on the Kenya-Uganda Railway which was built by the British between 1895 and 1901 linking the port of Mombasa with Uganda. This station also forms the junction between the main line and a smaller, now abandoned line to Taveta at the Tanzania border. The second, newer, railway station serves the Mombasa–Nairobi Standard Gauge Railway. The passenger train on the newer railway line has a daily stopover in Voi at 9:50am and 12:08pm. Passenger services on the old, British-built railway ceased in May 2017 though limited cargo services continue on that line.

Taxi
Taxis can be found in the town centre. Fares are negotiated, not regulated. There are taxis for various routes mainly to residential estates such as Mwakingali, Ikanga, Sikujua, Mabomani, Birikani, Sofia, Kaloleni, Tanzania, Msinga, Kariakoo, Msambweni and Mazeras.

Matatu
Matatus (Minibus/Sharetaxis) run between the town centre and surrounding areas. There are also matatus traveling to Mombasa, taita hills, Wundanyi, Taveta, Kasighau, Mbololo and other places. Their routes are regulated by SACCOs such as TATAMA, 2TS and Wumeri.

Bus
Coast bus, Simba coach, Tahmeed and Mash are among many bus companies that run day and night services to the rest of Kenya. Voi has a bus park where travellers can buy bus tickets for travel to various destinations across the country.

Air
The Ikanga Air Strip is nearby. It is still under construction by the Kenya Airports Authority.

Other forms of transport
Other forms of transport include three-wheeler auto rickshaws (tuk tuks) and motorcycle taxis (boda boda) which operate 24/7 and are very cheap.

Electoral Wards 
The Municipality is divided into six wards: Marungu, Sagalla, Mbololo, Kaloleni, Ngolia, and Kasigau.

Each ward elects one Member of the County Assembly (MCA) who represents her/his ward in the County Assembly for 5 years.

Tourism and entertainment
Voi is a major tourist hub. It neighbors the world-famous Tsavo East National Park, and the entrance to the park is near the town. Hotels such a Lion Hill Safari Lodge, Ndololo Camp, Voi Safari Lodge, Voi Wildlife Lodge are all located near the park gate and ten minutes drive from the town. Joy Hotel, Afrika Lodges, Vacani Resort, Impala Lodge and Leopards Lodge are near-by within the town's vicinity. There are nice restaurants; Asenali, Homeboys, Bakri, Distarr Hotel, Swahili Dishes, Fine breeze, Petro and Caltex. Supermarkets such as Bafagih, Jai Hari, Shake Distributors, New Generation, and Anand can also be found in Voi.

Internet services
Internet services are available from several internet cafes in town. There is 4G mobile phone coverage in Voi and its environs.

In fiction 
Voi features as a setting for two levels of the first-person shooter Xbox 360 console game Halo 3. Halo 3 takes place late in the year 2552, wherein Voi is depicted as formerly having been a heavily industrialized, sprawling city — vastly different from the real and present Voi. According to the backstory, the nearby city of Mombasa, renamed [halopedia.org/New_Mombasa New Mombasa], has become a final port of call for spacefaring traffic. To take advantage of its fortuitous proximity to New Mombasa, Voi refocused its resources from agriculture and tourism to the more lucrative pursuit of heavy industry. This shift resulted in major expansion of the town, which eventually absorbed the surrounding towns of Gutini, Ikanga, and Mariwenyi. The geography of the area has also been altered in the fictional version of Voi. Global warming has caused massive flooding of plains around the city of New Mombasa. Rather than a catastrophe, authorities viewed this event as an opportunity, and excavated a channel leading far inland to Voi. As a result, Voi became an inland port city, subsidising road transport of cargo to New Mombasa.
By the time of the events in the game, Voi has been almost entirely destroyed by ruthless excavation by the Covenant, the invading extraterrestrial enemy of humanity. Only an extant sliver of warehouse complexes, which hints at the former existence of Voi, is encountered within the game. The Taita Hills to the west are also used extensively in other levels within the game. A subterranean military base, known as Crow's Nest, is located in one of the Taita hills, specifically Chawia hill, located between Mlegwa and Mwatate.

References

Populated places in Taita-Taveta County
Tsavo National Park
County capitals in Kenya